The 2013 PBA All-Star Weekend was the annual all-star weekend of the Philippine Basketball Association (PBA)'s 2012–13 PBA season. The events were held from May 1 to 6, 2013 at the Davao del Sur Coliseum, Digos.

Highlighting the weekend was the Gilas Pilipinas vs. PBA All-Stars game, which was held at the final day of the weekend. The All-Star game format was adapted to prepare the national team for the upcoming 2013 FIBA Asia Championship, which was similarly done in 2009.

Friday events

Obstacle Challenges
Time in seconds.

Gold represents the current champion.
Jonas Villanueva won his four-peat for the Obstacle Challenge.

Three-point Shootout

Gold represents the current champion.

Slamdunk Contest

All-Star weekend

Greats vs. Stalwarts

Rosters

Team Greats:

Peter June Simon (San Mig Coffee)
Joe Devance (San Mig Coffee)
Mark Barroca (San Mig Coffee)
Paul Lee (Rain or Shine)
Mike Cortez (Air21)
Cliff Hodge (Meralco)
Noli Locsin (Legends)
Johnedel Cardel (Legends)
Rodney Santos (Legends)
Vince Hizon (Legends)
Bong Hawkins (Legends)
Playing coach: Jerry Codiñera (Legends)

Team Stalwarts:

Mark Macapagal (Meralco)
Ronald Tubid (Petron Blaze)
JC Intal (Barako Bull)
Chris Tiu (Rain or Shine)
Jervy Cruz (Rain or Shine)
Willie Miller (GlobalPort)
Dickie Bachmann (Legends)
Bong Ravena (Legends)
Topex Robinson (Legends)
Playing coach: Kenneth Duremdes (Legends)

Paul Lee, Cliff Hodge and Mark Barroca replaced Danny Seigle, Mark Cardona and Dondon Hontiveros for the Team Greats.
Ronjay Buenafe, Glenn Capacio, Benjie Paras and Sol Mercado were replaced by Mark Macapagal, Bong Ravena, Kenneth Duremdes and Willie Miller for the Team Stalwarts.
Art dela Cruz from Team Stalwarts and Josh Urbiztondo from Team Greats did not play in the game.

Game

The game was divided into four 10-minute quarters.
Kenneth Duremdes was named the game's MVP.

Sunday events

Shooting Stars Challenge

Gilas Pilipinas vs. PBA All-Stars

Rosters

Jay Washington of PBA All-Stars, and Jimmy Alapag, Ryan Reyes, Marcus Douthit and Greg Slaughter of Gilas Pilipinas did not play in the game.

Game

Arwind Santos and Jeffrei Chan were named the All Star Game MVPs.

Notes

References

See also
2012–13 PBA season
Philippine Basketball Association
Philippine Basketball Association All-Star Weekend

Philippine Basketball Association All-Star Weekend
Sports in Davao del Sur